Guva may refer to:
Guava
Cüvə, Azerbaijan
Guva, an underground prison cell used to hold errant Knights of St. John, located in the Fort St Angelo, Birgu, Malta.